Taipei City Constituency 5 includes all of Wanhua and most of Zhongzheng in western Taipei. The district was created in 2008, when all local constituencies of the Legislative Yuan were reorganized to become single-member districts.

Current district
 Wanhua
 Zhongzheng: 4 sub-districts
 Nanmen: 5 urban villages
 Nanmen, Aiguo, Longfu, Nanfu, Xinying
 Dongmen: 7 urban villages
 An'ai, Wenxiang, Xingfu, Meihua, Wenbei, Xingshi, Dongmen
 Kanding: 6 urban villages
 Yonggong, Zhongqin, Longguang, Yongchang, Sha'an, Longxing
 Chengnei: 3 urban villages
 Guangfu, Liming, Jianguo

Legislators

Election results

2020

2016

2012

2008

References 

Constituencies in Taipei